Booty and the Beast is a 1953 short subject directed by Jules White starring American slapstick comedy team The Three Stooges (Moe Howard, Larry Fine and Shemp Howard). It is the 145th entry in the series released by Columbia Pictures starring the comedians, who released 190 shorts for the studio between 1934 and 1959.

Premise
The Stooges inadvertently aid a safe-cracker (Kenneth MacDonald), who flees to Las Vegas with the stolen money. Realizing their error, the trio hop the train to Vegas to catch up with the thief, though not before accidentally freeing a lion from the baggage car. Eventually, the boys capture the nameless crook and retrieve the stolen money from him.

Production notes
Booty and the Beast was filmed in May 1952. The second half of the film consists of footage recycled from Hold That Lion!, which includes the cameo appearance by former Stooge Curly Howard, who died on January 18, 1952. The title of the film is a parody of the fairy tale Beauty and the Beast.

MacDonald's character in Hold That Lion was originally named Icabod Slipp: in Booty and the Beast, he is a nameless thug. Any references to Slipp are replaced with "He", "Him" or "that crook."

The short was released in the same year, where both, Curly and Tanner the Lion (the Lion from the recycled footage) had died.

References

External links 
 
 
Booty and the Beast at threestooges.net

1953 films
The Three Stooges films
American black-and-white films
Films directed by Jules White
Fiction about rail transport
1953 comedy films
Columbia Pictures short films
American comedy short films
1950s English-language films
1950s American films